The Western Reds were a rugby league football club based in Perth, Western Australia. Founded in 1992 as the Western Reds, they entered into the Australian Rugby League competition in 1995 before defecting to the rival Super League competition in 1997, where they rebranded themselves as the Perth Reds. However, by the end of the year the Reds had become a casualty of the Super League War peace deal and were shut down. The name Reds was named after the native Red Kangaroos. The Reds entered a state of limbo for the next decade but were revived as a lower-level club in 2006 by the WARL and ARL, under the name WA Reds.

History

Western Reds (1992–1996) 
The Reds had recruited well in 1993–94, and signed Peter Mulholland as their first coach. St. George fullback Michael Potter (twice winner of the Dally M Award), 1992 Rookie of year and CLEO bachelor of the year Matthew Rodwell, and Australian and NSW rep player Brad Mackay were three of the major signings.

Their first game, played at the WACA, was watched by a record 24,392, with the Reds defeating St George 28–16. When News Limited began its "blitzkrieg" in April 1995, the Reds aligned themselves with Super League along with nine other Australian Rugby League clubs. That season the Reds were the best performing of the three expansion teams introduced, winning 11 of their 22 games, including 8 at home, which drew an average crowd of around 13,000, larger than that of many Sydney teams.

The Reds even recruited local identity and decorated WAFL and West Coast Eagles (AFL) player Adrian Barich. Barich, having grown up in Canberra reverted from Australian rules football to rugby league, finishing his career with seasons with the Reds, however he never played in first grade.

After declaring that the club may not have the financial resources to compete in the 1996 ARL Optus Cup, a major sponsorship with the Rupert Murdoch-owned Sunday Times gave the club some much needed money. By mid 1996 club support had dwindled to just over 6,000.

Perth Reds (1997)

In 1997 the Reds became one of eight ARL teams to join the rival Super League during the dispute known as the Super League war. They changed their name to the Perth City Reds for the 1997 Super League season, and adopted a jersey of red, white and black. Although the club had made some promising signings, such as Rodney Howe and Robbie Kearns, the crushing $10 million debt that hung over the club (from having to pay the airfares for all visiting teams) at the end of the season led to Super League axing the Perth Reds on 1 October 1997.

Hiatus (1998–2005)
Rugby league has continued to be played in Western Australia since the Reds left the top-flight competition with the Swan Brewery Cup continuing and NRL matches being staged at various times since 1998.  On 8 May 1999, Melbourne Storm played Western Suburbs Magpies at Lathlain Park in Perth, with Melbourne running out winners 62–6. In 2005, Cronulla Sharks took their home game against the New Zealand Warriors to Perth Oval, and played in front of around 13,000 spectators.

WA Reds (2006–2011)
The WARL resurrected the Reds in 2006 with the intent of joining the National Rugby League in the future. In 2008 the Reds joined the Jim Beam Cup and played out of Perth Oval.

In the 2009 Bundaberg Red Cup the Reds were winless until the back-end of the season when they won 3 of their 4 last games, giving them something to build on for the next season. Darwin Rugby League product Aaron Barnes was named the Reds' player of the year. Unfortunately for financial reasons the Reds snr team was withdrawn from the Bundy Cup for 2010.

In 2010 the WA Reds entered an Under 18's team in the S. G. Ball Cup competition. The first trial game on 30 January 2010 was against the runners-up of the Western Australia Rugby League competition the Central Bulldogs – they won 38–20. The WARL have set up two junior academies to help develop players for a return to the NRL with the SG Ball side providing a staging ground for player development. The WA Reds juniors won their first SG Ball game beating the Balmain Tigers at ME Stadium 28–8.

Whilst the team found it tough going against often bigger and more experienced sides they did claim a couple of scalps and at the end of the season Curtis Rona was signed by the Sydney Roosters, earning a call up to the under 20s side during 2010.

A new bid logo was launched in 2010 and membership for fans was made available. NRL CEO David Gallop recognised the WA Reds 2013 bid on a number of occasions, speaking positively about the potential for a Perth team in the NRL, but as of now, no such offer has become official.

West Coast Pirates (2012-)

In 2012 the WARL launched the West Coast Pirates as the Perth bid team for an NRL licence. As of 2012 West Coast competes in the SG Ball Cup instead of the WA Reds.

Players

1995 U/21 Reds
 Jade Koteka
 David Hignett
 Loa Tupou
 Paul Muller
 Darren Mullholland
 Duncan Arkley
 Will Bramwell
 Ward Denman
 Matt Geyer
 Andrew Lippiat
 Chris Scarisbrick
 Leon Ruri
 Aaron Ritchie
 Nick Twiddle
 David Huber
 Shaun Owen
 Brock McDonald
 Myles Ritchie
 Wayne Blazey
 Brett Hyland
 Brian McCarthey
 Graeme Shield
 Jarred Millar
 Chris Lott
 Jason Edmunds (Captain)
 Tony Hemana
 Byron Hutton
 Ryan Gundry
 Adam Beard
 Dwayne Evans
 Daniel Cross
 Michael Jackson
 Dane Dorahy
 Ryan Dissegna
 Sean Edmunds

1st Grade
 Mark Anderson
 Simon Kricheldorff
 Mark Geyer
 Matt Geyer
 Rodney Howe
 Robbie Kearns
 Brad Mackay
 Barrie-Jon Mather
 Simon Robbie
 Scott Wilson
 David Dowell
 Shayne McMenemy 
 Danny Davies

WA Reds (2006–2011)
 Liam Mulhall
 Savi Hafoka
 Pikari Te Wara
 Clae Morgan
 Heath Egglestone 
 Ryan Dickson
 Matt Doeg
 James Blake
 Issac Thomas
 John Phipps
 James McGowan
 Delane Edwards
 Taurean Sheehan
 Joel Freeman
 Gareth Morton
 Aaron Barnes
 Nathan Searle
 Carlin Miller
 Michael Elphick
 Ben McCrone
 Frank Matthewman

Recent and current NRL WARL-produced players
 Bryson Goodwin (South Sydney Rabbitohs)
 Bronx Goodwin (St. George Illawarra Dragons)
 Cory Paterson (Newcastle Knights)
 Jon Green (St. George Illawarra Dragons)
 Daniel Holdsworth (Salford City Reds)
 Matt Petersen (Wakefield Trinity Wildcats)
 Lee Te Maari (Parramatta Eels)
 Curtis Rona (Canterbury Bulldogs)
 Waqa Blake (Parramatta Eels)

Internationals
 Rodney Howe (1997)
 Julian O'Neill (1997)
 Barrie-Jon Mather (1997)
 Shayne McMenemy (2007)
 Halvor Harris (2015)
 Bradley Williams (2015)

Coaches
 John Dorahy (U/21 1995)
 Peter Mulholland (1995–96)
 Dean Lance (1997)

Club records

Biggest Win
 28 points, 34–6 against Canterbury Bulldogs at Perth Oval on 23 March 1997.

Biggest Loss
42 points, 0–42 against Sydney Bulldogs at Parramatta Stadium on 9 April 1995.

Most Consecutive Wins
 2 matches, 1–8 July 1995
 2 matches, 21–28 July 1995
 2 matches, 12–18 August 1995
 2 matches, 14–20 July 1996
 2 matches, 23–27 March 1997

Most Consecutive Loses
 9 matches, 13 April – 23 June 1996

Most First Grade Matches
 59 – Matthew "Matt" Fuller (1995–97)

Most First Grade Points
 210 – Chris Ryan (21 tries, 63 goals)

Most First Grade Tries
 21 – Chris Ryan

Most Points in a Season
 136 – Chris Ryan (9 tries, 50 goals)

Most Tries in a Season
 10 – Matthew "Matt" Fuller (1995)

Most Points in a Match
 26 – Julian O'Neill (4 tries, 5 goals. v Canterbury, 1997)

Most Tries in a Match
 4 – Julian O'Neill (v Canterbury, 1997)

Most Goals in a Match
 6 – Julian O'Neill (v Auckland, 1996)
 6 – Damien Chapman (v Penrith, 1997)

See also

West Coast Pirates
National Rugby League
Western Australia Rugby League
Rugby league in Western Australia

References

The History of Rugby League Clubs. By Ian Collis and Alan Whiticker.
Super League: The Inside Story. By Mike Colman.

External links
Western Australian Rugby League
Perth Reds (archived)
WA Reds
RL1908's Western Reds Page
The Official NRL 2003 Season Guide
 Round 3V Bulls
 WA Reds Squad 09

1992 establishments in Australia
1997 disestablishments in Australia
Defunct rugby league teams in Australia
Rugby clubs established in 1992
Rugby league teams in Western Australia
Sporting clubs in Perth, Western Australia
Sports clubs disestablished in 1997
Western Reds